Murtazi Dzheyranovich Alakhverdov (born 12 September 1980) is a Russian professional football player. He plays for FC Sakhalin Yuzhno-Sakhalinsk.

Club career
He made his Russian Football National League debut for FC Sakhalin Yuzhno-Sakhalinsk on 6 July 2014 in a game against FC Anzhi Makhachkala.

External links
 
 

1980 births
People from Shida Kartli
Living people
Russian footballers
Association football defenders
FC Dynamo Barnaul players
FC Sibir Novosibirsk players
FC Irtysh Omsk players
FC Sakhalin Yuzhno-Sakhalinsk players
FC Baikal Irkutsk players